Scenic is an unincorporated community in Pennington County, South Dakota, United States. It is located within Scenic Township, which had a 2010 census population of 58 inhabitants.

History

The community was so named for the "scenic" setting of the town site.

As an economic decline hit the town in the 21st century, local businesswoman Twila Merrill acquired more and more of the town property until she owned most of it.

In July 2011, the  town and surrounding area—about  total—was listed for sale at $799,000.  The sale included the post office  (ZIP code 57780), Longhorn Saloon, a dance hall, bunkhouse, museum, and two stores.  It also includes a train depot that is on an abandoned line that was part of the Chicago, Milwaukee, St. Paul and Pacific Railroad and is the subject of a  rails-to-trail project between Rapid City and Kadoka.

In August 2011, the Iglesia ni Cristo (INC), an independent, nontrinitarian Christian denomination based in the Philippines, bought the property for nearly $800,000, Pennington County records show. The church never disclosed why it acquired the property. In 2014, Daniel Simmons-Ritchie of the Rapid City Journal wrote that the INC "has done little with the town since its purchase."

In April 2015, an INC minister moved to the area and soon afterwards began leading services for 10–15 congregants who live near Scenic.

See also
 Swett, South Dakota, another town put up for sale
 Johnsonville Village, Connecticut, an abandoned community also purchased by the Iglesia ni Cristo

References

Unincorporated communities in Pennington County, South Dakota
Rapid City, South Dakota metropolitan area
Unincorporated communities in South Dakota
Iglesia ni Cristo